The Białka is a mountain river running through southern Poland. It is a tributary of the Dunajec River. The Białka is only about 40 km long, part of which forms the border with Slovakia. The source of the river is in the High Tatras.

The towns and townships located on or near the Białka river include: Jurgów, Białka Tatrzańska, Trybsz, Krempachy, Dębno, and Frydman.

References

Rivers of Poland
Poland–Slovakia border
Rivers of Lesser Poland Voivodeship
Braided rivers in Europe